North Macedonia competed at the 2019 European Games in Minsk from 21 to 30 June 2019. North Macedonia was represented by 12 athletes in 8 sports.

Competitors

Boxing

Men

Canoe sprint

Men

Cycling

Road
Men

Judo

Women

Karate

Kumite

Men

Sambo

Men

Shooting

Men

Wrestling

Men's Freestyle

References 

Nations at the 2019 European Games
European Games
2019